Paweł Czoska (born 31 August 1990 in Wejherowo) is a Polish former professional footballer who played as a midfielder.

External links
 

1990 births
Living people
People from Wejherowo
Sportspeople from Pomeranian Voivodeship
Polish footballers
Association football midfielders
Poland under-21 international footballers
Arka Gdynia players
Olimpia Elbląg players
Warta Poznań players
Radomiak Radom players
Gryf Wejherowo players
Ekstraklasa players
I liga players
II liga players
III liga players
IV liga players